Merely Mary Ann is a lost 1916 silent film comedy-drama directed by John G. Adolfi and starring Vivian Martin and Harry Hilliard. It is based on the 1903 Broadway play by Israel Zangwill. It was produced and released by the Fox Film Corporation.

Cast
Vivian Martin - Mary Ann
Edward Hoyt - Reverend Smudge
Harry Hilliard -
Laura Lyman - 
Isabel O'Madigan -
Sidney Bracey - 
Niles Welch -

See also
1937 Fox vault fire
List of Fox Film films

References

External links

1916 films
American silent feature films
Lost American films
American black-and-white films
Films directed by John G. Adolfi
Fox Film films
Silent American comedy-drama films
1916 comedy-drama films
1916 lost films
Lost comedy-drama films
1910s American films